The Tharabha Gate (also spelled Sarabha or Tharaba) is the only surviving gate of Bagan (Pagan). The gate is located to the east of the old city. Although the Burmese chronicles assert that the city of Bagan was fortified in 849 CE, radiocarbon dating of evidence dates the foundation of the main walls to c. 1020 CE. If the city was fortified in the 9th century as the chronicles assert, the fortifications must have been built with less durable materials like mud.

The present-day gate consists of two brick-walled shrines, each opposing one another, of two guardian nats, named Min Mahagiri and Hnamadawgyi (Shwemyethna), who allegedly were executed by order of a king.

3D Documentation 
The Zamani Project from the University of Cape Town, South Africa, offered its services towards the spatial documentation of monuments in Bagan in response to the destruction of monuments by an earthquake in August 2016 including the Tharabha Gate.

Notes

References
 
 

Bagan